Hartshorne Public Schools is a school district headquartered in Hartshorne, Oklahoma. It includes an elementary school and a middle-high school.

It serves Hartsthorne, Adamson, and a portion of Haileyville.

Boarders in grades 7–12 at Jones Academy, a Native American boarding school, are educated by Hartsthorne school district.

History
Mark Ichord served as superintendent until his retirement in 2017. Jason Lindley replaced him.

In March 2020 Lindley suspended spring activities and criticized the state government's handling of the COVID-19 pandemic in Oklahoma.

References

External links
 Hartshorne Public Schools

School districts in Oklahoma
Education in Pittsburg County, Oklahoma